Jesús Alejandro Gómez Molina (born 31 January 2002) is a Mexican professional footballer who plays as a centre-back for Liga MX club Atlas.

Club career

Atlas
Gómez made his professional debut on 22 January 2019 with Atlas in the Copa MX group stage match against Leones Negros UdeG, losing 2–1. On 29 March, he made his Liga MX debut against Santos Laguna in a 1–0 victory.

Boavista (loan)
In August 2020, Gómez joined Portuguese club Boavista in a year-long loan. He made his Primeira Liga debut with the club on 19 September against C.D. Nacional, playing as a starter and finishing in a 3–3 draw.

International career

Youth
Gómez was part of the under-17 side that participated at the 2019 CONCACAF U-17 Championship, where Mexico won the competition. He was included in the Best XI of the tournament. He also participated at the 2019 U-17 World Cup, where Mexico finished runner-up. Gómez was included in the France Football team of the tournament.

Senior
In September 2020, less than a year following his participation at the U-17 World Cup, Gómez was called up to the senior national team by Gerardo Martino to participate in October friendlies against the Netherlands and Algeria.

Career statistics

Club

Honours
Atlas
Liga MX: Apertura 2021, Clausura 2022
Campeón de Campeones: 2022

Mexico U17
CONCACAF U-17 Championship: 2019
FIFA U-17 World Cup runner-up: 2019

Individual
CONCACAF U-17 Championship Best XI: 2019
France Football FIFA U-17 World Cup Best XI: 2019

References

External links

2002 births
Living people
Mexican footballers
Association football defenders
Atlas F.C. footballers
Boavista F.C. players
Liga MX players
Primeira Liga players
Mexican expatriate footballers
Expatriate footballers in Portugal
Footballers from Sonora
Sportspeople from Hermosillo
Mexico youth international footballers
21st-century Mexican people